Kauman is a village name used by regencies and municipalities in Central and East Java to name an area where pious Muslim communities are concentrated.

A Kauman village is usually located on the west side of a town square with a mosque adjacent to the square.

Javanese culture
Islam in Indonesia